The Trax is a series of "Multi Utility Vehicles" (MUVs) built by Force Motors in Pune, India (the company was called "Bajaj Tempo" at the time of introduction). There has also been an SUV version called the Gama, especially aimed at private buyers, while the vehicle also receives many additional names such as Cruiser and Judo.

The vehicles are of simple and durable construction, suited for the severe conditions found in the Indian countryside. Originally there were three models; the Town and Country, the Trax Challenger, and the Pick-up. In 1998, the four-wheel drive "Tempo Trax Gurkha" was introduced, originally aimed mostly at military users. The Trax can hold up to 13 passengers in the LWB versions.

The engines used were originally versions of Mercedes-Benz OM616 2.4 litre four-cylinder diesel, with an available turbo version for the top-of-the-line Trax Gurkha, but these have been replaced by a larger  TD 2650 F, still Mercedes derived.

In Philippines, Tempo Trax rebadged version, Togo Tracker is locally made by Morales Motors. The Tracker also offered as passenger van or chassis cab for jeepneys and utility trucks.

References

Force Motors Trax
Force Motors Trax
Trax